Hawk Point is a city in Lincoln County, Missouri, United States. The population was 669 at the 2010 census.

History
A post office called Hawk Point has been in operation since 1840. The community was named for the fact that hawks nested near the original town site.

Geography
Hawk Point is located at  (38.971207, -91.133888).

Demographics

2010 census
As of the census of 2010, there were 669 people, 247 households, and 169 families living in the city. The racial makeup of the city was 94.0% White, 1.3% African American, 0.1% Native American, 0.6% from other races, and 3.9% from two or more races. Hispanic or Latino of any race were 5.8% of the population.

There were 247 households, of which 42.5% had children under the age of 18 living with them, 46.2% were married couples living together, 14.2% had a female householder with no husband present, 8.1% had a male householder with no wife present, and 31.6% were non-families. 24.7% of all households were made up of individuals, and 6.9% had someone living alone who was 65 years of age or older. The average household size was 2.65 and the average family size was 3.12.

The median age in the city was 30.4 years. 28.4% of residents were under the age of 18; 10.2% were between the ages of 18 and 24; 30.2% were from 25 to 44; 23.3% were from 45 to 64; and 7.9% were 65 years of age or older. The gender makeup of the city was 49.6% male and 50.4% female.

2000 census
As of the census of 2000, there were 459 people, 186 households, and 119 families living in the city. The racial makeup of the city was 97.82% White, 0.44% Asian, and 1.74% from two or more races.

There were 186 households, out of which 39.2% had children under the age of 18 living with them, 40.9% were married couples living together, 15.6% had a female householder with no husband present, and 35.5% were non-families. 32.8% of all households were made up of individuals, and 13.4% had someone living alone who was 65 years of age or older. The average household size was 2.47 and the average family size was 3.04.

In the city the population was spread out, with 31.8% under the age of 18, 9.6% from 18 to 24, 32.0% from 25 to 44, 14.8% from 45 to 64, and 11.8% who were 65 years of age or older. The median age was 31 years. For every 100 females, there were 102.2 males. For every 100 females age 18 and over, there were 100.6 males.

The median income for a household in the city was $29,286, and the median income for a family was $42,500. Males had a median income of $28,594 versus $20,313 for females. The per capita income for the city was $14,823. About 8.9% of families and 9.6% of the population were below the poverty line, including 11.1% of those under age 18 and 11.8% of those age 65 or over.

Education
The Lincoln County R-III School District serves Hawk Point.

References

External links

Cities in Lincoln County, Missouri
Cities in Missouri